This is a list of Richmond Football Club players who have made one or more appearance in the Australian Football League (AFL), known as the Victorian Football League (VFL) until 1990. Richmond entered the VFL in 1908.

VFL/AFL players

1900s

1910s

1920s

1930s

1940s

1950s

1960s

1970s

1980s

1990s

2000s

2010s

2020s

Other AFL-listed players

Listed players yet to make their debut for Richmond

Formerly listed players who never played a senior game for Richmond
Includes players delisted after the 2000–2019 seasons.

AFL Women's players

2020s

Other AFL Women's-listed players

Listed players yet to make their debut for Richmond

Formerly listed players who never played a senior game for Richmond

See also
List of Richmond Football Club coaches

References
AFL Tables – All Time Player List – Richmond
Australian Football Richmond AFLW Every Player

Players

Richmond
Richmond Football Club players